The 1937 Tour de Hongrie was the 11th edition of the Tour de Hongrie cycle race and was held from 26 to 30 June 1937. The race started and finished in Budapest. The race was won by Anton Strakati.

Route

General classification

References

1937
Tour de Hongrie
Tour de Hongrie